Eliška Kleinová, born Elisabeth "Lisa" Klein (February 27, 1912, Přerov, Moravia – September 2, 1999, Prague) was a Czech Jewish pianist, music educator, and was the sister of Gideon Klein.

Eliška Kleinová was born as a daughter of Jindřich/Heinrich Klein, and Helene (born Ilona Marmorstein).

See also 
 Gideon Klein
 Viktor Ullmann

References 
 Peter Ambros(de): Leben vom Blatt gespielt.  (Lebensgeschichte auf Basis eines Tonbandinterviews von 1994)
 Anna Hájková, The Piano Virtuoso Who Didn't Play in Terezín, or, Why Gender Matters (Orel Foundation, May 6, 2011)
 Joža Karas, "Music in Terezín, 1941-1945," Pendragon Press, 2008, pp.10,94,199
USC Shoah Foundation Institute testimony of Eliska Kleinová - Oral History | VHA Interview Code: 15454
 Rebecca Rovit, Alvin Goldfarb, Theatrical Performance During the Holocaust: Texts, Documents, Memoirs.  (Johns Hopkins University Press, 1999), p. 198

External links
 Nadace Gideona Kleina - Die Gideon Klein Stiftung

1912 births
1999 deaths
Musicians from Přerov
Czech Jews
Czech educators
Czech pianists
Czech women pianists
Jewish classical musicians
20th-century pianists
20th-century classical musicians
Women classical pianists
20th-century women pianists